Maravovo (or alternatively Marovovo) is a village on the northwest coast of Guadalcanal, Solomon Islands. Mangakiki is in close proximity to Maravovo. The population is reportedly entirely Anglican.
On 7 October 1942, during the Guadalcanal campaign, the Japanese established a small midget submarine base there. On 7 February 1943, when the first American troops reached the area, they only encountered slight resistance, and found out most of the Japanese had already been previously evacuated during Operation Ke.
Wreck of one of the midget submarine still lies underwater in the bay facing the village.

Notable people
Ini Kopuria (died 1945), police officer who formed the Melanesian Brotherhood in 1925

References

Populated places in Guadalcanal Province